The 2003 European Individual Speedway Junior Championship was the sixth edition of the Championship.

Qualification
Scandinavian Final (Semi-Final A):
August 23, 2003
 Herning
Semi-Final B:
August 24, 2003
 Lendawa
Semi-Final C:
August 31, 2003
 Zarnovice

Final
September 20, 2003
 Pocking

References

2003
Euro I J